{{DISPLAYTITLE:C12H12N2}}
The molecular formula C12H12N2 (molar mass: 184.24 g/mol) may refer to:

 Abametapir
 Benzidine
 Diquat (C12H12N22+)
 Hydrazobenzene